The Hunt of the Unicorn or the Unicorn Tapestries is a series of seven tapestries made in the South Netherlands around 1495–1505, and now in The Cloisters in New York.  They were  possibly designed in Paris and show a group of noblemen and hunters in pursuit of a unicorn through an idealised French landscape. The tapestries were woven in wool, metallic threads, and silk. The vibrant colours, still evident today, were produced from dye plants: weld (yellow), madder (red), and woad (blue).

First recorded in 1680 in the Paris home of the Rochefoucauld family, the tapestries were looted during the French Revolution. Rediscovered in a barn in the 1850s, they were hung at the family's Château de Verteuil. Since then they have been the subject of intense scholarly debate about the meaning of their iconography, the identity of the artists who designed them, and the sequence in which they were meant to be hung. Although various theories have been put forward, as yet nothing is known of their early history or provenance, and their dramatic but conflicting narratives have inspired multiple readings, from chivalric to Christological. Variations in size, style, and composition suggest they come from more than one set, linked by their subject matter, provenance, and the mysterious AE monogram which appears in each. One of the panels, "The Mystic Capture of the Unicorn", survives as just two fragments.

James J. Rorimer speculated in 1942 that the tapestries were commissioned by Anne of Brittany, to celebrate her marriage to Louis XII, King of France in 1499. Rorimer interpreted the A and E monogram that appears in each tapestry as the first and the last letters of Anne's name. Margaret B. Freeman, however, rejected this interpretation in her 1976 monograph, a conclusion repeated by Adolph S. Cavallo in his 1998 work. Tom Campbell, former Director of the Metropolitan Museum of Art, recently acknowledged that experts "still do not know for whom or where [the tapestries] were made."  So far, scholarly efforts to explain the AE and other inscriptions, to identify the few heraldic symbols, and to coherently account for the puzzling narratives have met with limited success.

Themes

One theory is that the tapestries show pagan and Christian symbolism. The pagan themes emphasise the medieval lore of beguiled lovers, whereas Christian writings interpret the unicorn and its death as the Passion of Christ. The unicorn has long been identified by Christian writers as a symbol of Christ, conscripting the traditionally pagan symbolism of the unicorn. The original pagan myths about The Hunt of the Unicorn refer to an animal with a single horn that can only be tamed by a virgin; Christian scholars translated this into an allegory for Christ's relationship with the Virgin Mary.

In the Gothic tapestry, the makers considered biblical events as historical, and linked the biblical and secular narratives in the tapestry weaving. Medieval art illustrated moral principles, and the tapestries used narrative allegories to illustrate these morals. The secular unicorn hunt was not simply Christian art, but also an allegorical representation of the Annunciation.

Acknowledging Rorimer's speculation that the tapestries were commissioned to celebrate a marriage, Freeman noted that medieval poets connected the taming of the unicorn to the devotion and subjugation of love. The taming of the unicorn symbolises the secular lover or mate who was enchained by a virgin and entrapped in the fence (in the tapestry The Unicorn in Captivity). In addition, the author pointed out that the concept of an overlapping God of Heaven and God of love was accepted in the late Middle Ages.

The making of the tapestries 

Questions about the original workmanship of the tapestries remain unanswered. The design of the tapestries is rich in figurative elements similar to those found in oil painting. Apparently influenced by the French style, the elements in the tapestries reflect the woodcuts and metalcuts made in Paris in the late fifteenth century.

The garden backgrounds of the tapestries are rich in floral imagery, featuring the "millefleurs" background style of a variety of small botanic elements. Invented by the weavers of the Gothic age, it became popular during the late medieval era and declined after the early Renaissance. There are more than a hundred plants represented in the tapestries, scattered across the green backgrounds of the panels, eighty-five of which have been identified by botanists. The particular flowers featured in the tapestries reflect the tapestries' major themes. In the unicorn series, the hunt takes place within a Hortus conclusus, literally meaning "enclosed garden," which was not only a representation of a secular, physical garden, but a connection with the Annunciation.

The tapestries were very probably woven in Brussels, which was an important center of the tapestry industry in medieval Europe. An example of the remarkable work of the Brussels looms, the tapestries' mixture of silk and metallic thread with wool gave them a fine quality and brilliant color. The wool was widely produced in the rural areas around Brussels, and a common primary material in tapestry weaving. The silk, however, was costly and hard to obtain, indicating the wealth and social status of the tapestry owner.

Subjects
The seven tapestries are:

 "The Start of the Hunt"
 "The Unicorn at the Fountain"
 "The Unicorn Attacked"
 "The Unicorn Defending Himself"
 "The Unicorn Captured by the Virgin" (two fragments)
 "The Unicorn Killed and Brought to the Castle"
 "The Unicorn in Captivity"
The tapestries comprise five large pieces, one small piece, and two fragments.

The mobility associated with the size formed an essential consideration of the function of the tapestry in the medieval age and different sizes of Gothic tapestries served as the decoration to fit chosen walls in the middle age. In modern-day research, based on the possibility that the unicorn tapestries were designed for use as a bedroom ensemble, the five large pieces fit the back area of a wall, while the other two pieces serve as the coverlet, or overhead canopy.

Other sources give slightly different titles and different sequences. The factors that affect this are primarily threefold. Firstly the nature of the tapestries themselves, which exhibit differences of manufacture and size, suggesting that the first and last may be independent works or form a different series. Secondly the nature of the classic stag hunt, usually cited to Livre de la Chasse by Gaston III, Count of Foix. Thirdly the established story of the unicorn hunt, where the unicorn is made docile by a virgin, and then captured, wounded or killed. In addition the symbolism of the story needs to be taken into account.

Provenance
The tapestries were owned by the La Rochefoucauld family of France for several centuries, with first mention of them showing up in the family's 1728 inventory.  At that time five of the tapestries were hanging in a bedroom in the family's Château de Verteuil, Charente and two were stored in a hall adjacent to the chapel.  The tapestries were highly believed woven for François, the son of Jean II de La Rochefoucauld and Marguerite de Barbezieux. And there was a possible connection between the letters A and E and the La Rochefoucauld, which are interpreted as the first and last of Antoine's name, who was the son of François, and his wife, Antoinette of Amboise. During the French Revolution the tapestries were looted from the château and reportedly were used to cover potatoes – a period during which they apparently sustained damage.  By the end of the 1880s they were again in the possession of the family.  A visitor to the château described them as quaint 15th century wall hangings, yet showing "incomparable freshness and grace".  The same visitor records the set as consisting of seven pieces, though one was by that time in fragments and being used as bed curtains.

John D. Rockefeller Jr. bought them in 1922 for about one million US dollars. Six of the tapestries hung in Rockefeller's house until The Cloisters was built when he donated them to the Metropolitan Museum of Art in 1938 and at the same time secured for the collection the two fragments the La Rochefauld family had retained. The set now hangs in The Cloisters which houses the museum's medieval collection.

Restoration
In 1998 the tapestries were cleaned and restored. In the process, the linen backing was removed, the tapestries were bathed in water, and it was discovered that the colours on the back were in even better condition than those on the front (which are also quite vivid). A series of high resolution digital photographs were taken of both sides using a customised scanning device suspending a linear array scan camera and lighting over the delicate textile. The front and back of the tapestries were photographed in approximately three-by-three-foot square segments. The largest tapestry required up to 24 individual 5000 × 5000 pixel images. Merging the massive data stored in these photos required the efforts of two mathematicians, the Chudnovsky brothers.

Recreation

Historic Scotland commissioned a set of seven hand-made tapestries for Stirling Castle, a recreation of The Hunt of the Unicorn tapestries, as part of a project to furnish the castle as it was in the 16th century.  It was part-funded by the Quinque Foundation of the United States.

All seven currently hang in the Queen's Inner Hall in the Royal Palace.

The tapestry project was managed by West Dean College in West Sussex and work began in January 2002. The weavers worked in two teams, one based at the college, the other in a purpose-built studio in the Nether Bailey of Stirling Castle. The first three tapestries were completed in Chichester, the remainder at Stirling Castle.

Historians studying the reign of James IV believe that a similar series of "Unicorn" tapestries were part of the Scottish Royal tapestry collection. The team at West Dean Tapestry visited the Metropolitan Museum of Art to inspect the originals and researched the medieval techniques, the colour palette and materials. Traditional techniques and materials were used with mercerised cotton taking the place of silk to preserve its colour better. The wool was specially dyed at West Dean College.

In popular culture

 In 1961, Leonard Cohen published The Spice Box of Earth, a collection of poems including "The Unicorn Tapestries". 
 The opening sequence of the 1982 animated movie The Last Unicorn was designed in reference to the tapestries, with many elements such as the fountain and lions, as well as the overall style being extremely similar.
 The seventh tapestry in the series ("The Unicorn in Captivity") appears briefly in Harry Potter and the Half Blood Prince, adorning the wall of a corridor near the Room of Requirement and the tapestry is seen in the various common rooms (Gryffindor, Slytherin, Ravenclaw, and Hufflepuff) with different coloured backgrounds. Also appears in the movie Harry Potter and the Deathly Hallows.  At Universal Studios in Los Angeles and Orlando replicas of this tapestry can be see adorning the wall in the queue for the Forbidden Journey ride which replicates the interior of the Hogwarts Castle.
 It appears in Spider-Man: Far From Home in the art room of the school. In the shot of MJ’s (Zendaya) first appearance The Unicorn in Captivity can be spotted in the upper right corner.
 It appears in Rumpelstiltskin's castle in Once Upon a Time.
 It appears in the episode "The Lich" in Season 4 of Adventure Time.
 It appears above Stewie's cot in the episode "Chap Stewie" of season 12 of Family Guy.
 It appears in BoJack Horseman in S2E2
 The tapestry "The Unicorn is Found" appears in one of the last scenes in the film Ghosts of Girlfriends Past.
 It appears in the 1988 film Some Girls.
 It appears in the 1993 film The Secret Garden.
 In a French commercial for the cheese "Coeur de Lion", which means "Lionheart". Pub Coeur de Lion – Moyen Age.
 A collage of the tapestry appears on the cover of the music album The Mask and Mirror by Canadian composer-musician Loreena McKennitt.
 The tapestries' millefleur were adapted and redesigned by artist Leon Coward for the mural The Happy Garden of Life in the 2016 sci-fi movie 2BR02B: To Be or Naught to Be as part of the mural's religious allusions. The flowers are modeled on those in The Unicorn in Captivity.
 Elementary school readers of Mary Pope Osborne's popular Magic Tree House series are introduced to the tapestries and the Cloisters Museum in Blizzard of the Blue Moon.
 The tapestries are the subject matter of Samuel R. Delany's short story "Tapestry," found in Aye, and Gomorrah, and other stories.
 It appears in a seventh-season episode of The Venture Brothers, which is also named after the tapestry.
 "The Unicorn in Captivity" is displayed in Sabrina's house in the 2018 TV series The Chilling Adventures of Sabrina (best seen in episode 9).
 "The Unicorn in Captivity" is displayed in Niles Caulder's house in the 2019 TV series Doom Patrol (best seen in episode 7).
 The tapestries are mentioned in the 1982 novel Annie on My Mind in which the main characters see and discuss the tapestries while visiting The Cloisters Museum.

Gallery

See also
 The Lady and the Unicorn, another series of unicorn tapestries from the same period

References

Citations

Bibliography

Further reading

External links

 Unicorn tapestries in the collection of the MET
 
 The Hunt and The Cloisters, Temple of the Sun

Collection of the Metropolitan Museum of Art
Gothic art
Tapestries
Unicorns
1500s works
1490s works
Animals in art
Hunting in popular culture
Dogs in art
Deer in art
Horses in art
Hunting in art
Birds in art
Rabbits and hares in art